Nadezhda Koltakova is a Russian football defender, currently playing for Ryazan-VDV in the Russian Championship.

She started her career in Zvezda Zvenigorod. When Zvezda was disbanded after the 2010 season she signed for national champion WFC Rossiyanka, with which she won her first championship in 2012 and she made her UEFA Champions League debut in the 2012-13 season.

A former under-19 international, she scored Russia's first goal in the 2011 U-19 European Championship against Italy.

References

1992 births
Living people
Russian women's footballers
WFC Rossiyanka players
Women's association football defenders
Ryazan-VDV players
FC Zorky Krasnogorsk (women) players
Russia women's international footballers
21st-century Russian women